Minerva Clark Gets a Clue is the first book in the Minerva Clark series of mystery novels. Minerva Clark Gets a Clue was written by Karen Karbo and was published by Bloomsbury Children's Books in 2005.

Plot summary
13-year-old Minerva Clark lives in Portland, Oregon and is being raised by her three brothers. She is a typical insecure teenager, but when she is struck by lightning, her personality changes – she becomes outgoing and confident overnight. And when she senses a mystery she cannot resist investigating.

Sequels
The other books in the series are Minerva Clark Goes to the Dogs (2006), and Minerva Clark Gives Up the Ghost (2007).

References

2005 American novels
Children's mystery novels
American children's novels
American mystery novels
Bloomsbury Publishing books
2005 children's books